"Let's Hang On!" is a song composed by Bob Crewe, Sandy Linzer, and Denny Randell that was popularized by The Four Seasons in 1965. The single reached the No. 3 position in the Billboard Hot 100 singles chart, the group's highest placement since "Rag Doll" hit the top spot in July 1964.

This was the last Four Seasons hit to feature bass singer/bassist Nick Massi.  The same month "Let's Hang On!" was released, Massi left the group and was temporarily replaced by the band's arranger Charles Calello before Joe Long came in as Massi's full-time replacement.

The popularity of "Let's Hang On!" has been attributed to the inclusion of several devices into the recording: a two-line introduction (sung by lead singer Frankie Valli), the use of two fuzz guitars (one guitarist playing low notes, another playing high notes on a fuzz bass), a chorus loaded with hooks and sung in falsetto, and backing vocals giving counterpoint with Valli's lead vocal. It re-established the group's presence in the Top Ten (of the Hot 100) as The Four Seasons were in a flurry of activity, recording albums both as The Four Seasons and as supporting musicians for Valli's rekindled "solo" career. In the UK, the song was a No. 4 hit for the group.

Billboard described the song as having a "hard-driving dance rhythm."  Cash Box described it as a "hard-rockin’ fast-moving rhythmic ode about a lucky fella who is mighty pleased that he’s fortunate enough to have met the girl of his dreams." 

The single's B-side, "On Broadway Tonight", was the theme of a CBS-TV variety series (1964–1965) hosted by Rudy Vallee.

Chart history

Weekly charts

Year-end charts

Barry Manilow cover

In 1981, the song was revived by Barry Manilow who hit No. 6 on the U.S. Billboard Adult Contemporary chart and No. 32 on the Hot 100. The single climbed to No. 12 in the United Kingdom and was certified silver, while peaking at No. 4 in Australia, No. 16 in Germany and No. 8 in Ireland.

Chart history

Weekly charts

Year-end charts

Certifications

Other cover versions
In 1966 Jan & Dean recorded "Let's Hang On!" for their 1966 Filet Of Soul album.

In 1969 Johnny Johnson and the Bandwagon covered the song and took it to No. 36 in the UK singles chart. Australian soft rock group, Dove, provided their rendition in 1975.

In 1980, the song was covered by British doo-wop band Darts who took it to No.11 in the UK singles chart. This was the band's last UK top 40 single.

In March 1990, British band Shooting Party covered the song. It peaked at 66.

In 1995, The Manhattan Transfer covered the song on their album Tonin', featuring lead guest vocals by the original singer Frankie Valli. The album reached No. 123 on the Billboard 200.

References

The Four Seasons (band) songs
Jan and Dean songs
1965 singles
1966 singles
1982 singles
Cashbox number-one singles
Songs written by Bob Crewe
Songs written by Sandy Linzer
Song recordings produced by Bob Crewe
The Manhattan Transfer songs
1965 songs
Philips Records singles
Arista Records singles
Songs written by Denny Randell
Barry Manilow songs